Jesse Lamont Martin (né Watkins; January 18, 1969) is an American actor and singer. He originated the role of Tom Collins on Broadway in the musical Rent and performed on television as NYPD Detective Ed Green on Law & Order and Captain Joe West on The Flash.

Early life 
Martin, the third of four sons, was born on January 18, 1969 in Rocky Mount, Virginia. His father, Jesse Reed Watkins (1943–2003), was a truck driver, and his mother, Virginia Price, a college counselor. He was born two months premature. His parents divorced when he was a child. His mother eventually remarried and Martin adopted his stepfather's surname.

When Martin was in grade school, the family relocated to Buffalo, New York, but Martin began to dislike speaking because of his Southern accent and was often overcome with shyness. A concerned educator and mentor influenced him to join an after-school drama program and cast him as the pastor in The Golden Goose. Being from Virginia, the young Martin played the character the only way he knew how: as an inspired Southern Baptist preacher. The act was a hit, and Martin emerged from his shell. Martin attended high school at the Buffalo Academy for Visual and Performing Arts, where he was voted "Most Talented" in his senior class. He later enrolled in New York University's Tisch School of the Arts' theatre program, and while at NYU he was also the popular president of Rubin Dorm, the former domain of Mark Twain.

Career 
After graduation, Martin toured the states with John Houseman's The Acting Company. He appeared in Shakespeare's Rock-in-Roles at the Actors Theatre of Louisville and The Butcher's Daughter at the Cleveland Play House, and returned to Manhattan to perform in local theatre, soap operas, and commercials. Finding that auditions, regional theater, and bit parts were no way to support himself, Martin waited tables at several restaurants around the city. He was serving a pizza when his appearance on CBS's Guiding Light aired in the same eatery. While the show aired, the whole waitstaff gathered around the bar television to cheer his performance. Often, during the dinner rush, he broke out in song. When he gave his customers their dinner checks, he told them to "keep it, because someday I'll be famous!" 

Martin made his Broadway debut in Timon of Athens, and then performed in The Government Inspector with Lainie Kazan. While employed at the Moondance Diner, he met the playwright Jonathan Larson, who also worked on the restaurant's staff. In 1996, Larson's musical Rent took the theatre world by storm, with Martin in the role of gay computer geek/philosophy professor Tom Collins. The 1990s update of Puccini's La Bohème earned six Drama Desk Awards, five Obie Awards, four Tony Awards, and the Pulitzer Prize. In 1998, the West End production of Rent opened with four of the original cast members, including Martin. He played Tad in the concept album of Bright Lights, Big City.

In 2010, Martin returned to the stage for one of his biggest theater commitments since Law & Order, performing in the productions of The Merchant of Venice and The Winter's Tale as a part of The Public Theater's Shakespeare in the Park at the Delacorte Theater in Central Park. He played the roles of Gratiano and King Polixenes, respectively. The two shows were performed in repertory, beginning with previews on June 9, 2010, through to the final performance on August 1, 2010.

The Merchant of Venice later transferred to Broadway to the Broadhurst Theater for a limited engagement, in which Martin reprised his role as Gratiano. The show began previews on October 19, 2010, and officially opened on November 7. The show began a hiatus on January 9 to accommodate Al Pacino's pre-existing obligations, and resumed from February 1, 2011, to February 20, 2011; Martin did not reprise his role after the hiatus due to other work commitments. He took part in a one-night-only reading benefit of Romeo and Juliet to celebrate the 50th anniversary of the opening of the Delacorte Theater in Central Park, alongside Meryl Streep, Kevin Kline, Raúl Esparza, and others on June 18, 2012.

Television work 
Martin landed roles on Fox's short-lived 413 Hope St. and Eric Bross's independent film Restaurant (1998). Ally McBeals creator, David E. Kelley, attended Rents Broadway premiere and remembered Martin when the show needed a new boyfriend for the title character. His performance as Dr. Greg Butters on Ally McBeal caught the attention of David Duchovny, who cast Martin as a baseball-playing alien in a 1999 episode of The X-Files titled "The Unnatural" that Duchovny wrote and directed.

While still shooting Ally McBeal, Martin heard rumors that actor Benjamin Bratt planned to leave the cast of Law & Order. Martin had tried out for the show years before and won the minor role of a car-radio thief named Earl the Hamster, but decided to wait for a bigger part. With the opportunity presenting itself, Martin approached Law & Order producer Dick Wolf regarding the opening. Wolf hoped to cast him, and upon hearing that CBS and Fox both offered Martin development deals, he gave the actor the part without an audition.

From 1999 to 2008, he played Detective Edward "Ed" Green on Law & Order. Altogether, he was the fifth-longest serving cast member behind S. Epatha Merkerson, Sam Waterston, Jerry Orbach, and Steven Hill. He had a brief hiatus at the end of the 2004–2005 season while he was filming the movie adaptation of Rent in which he reprised the role of Tom Collins. Martin's final episode of Law & Order aired April 23, 2008, as he was replaced by Anthony Anderson. Martin returned to NBC a year later as the co-star of The Philanthropist.

On September 14, 2012, NBC announced that Martin would be joining the cast of Smash during season two for a nine-episode arc as Scott Nichols, the artistic director of the Manhattan Theatre Workshop. Martin also starred in an NBC pilot called The Secret Lives of Husbands and Wives as Greg Cooke, however it was not picked up to series.

Martin currently portrays Joe West in the superhero series The Flash, a spin-off from Arrow which premiered in October 2014. In the third season episode "Duet", Martin played gangster Digsy Foss in Barry and Kara's dreamworld. In its fifth season in 2018, a back injury forced Martin to take medical leave following the season's fourth episode. From the start of the season until then he was almost always leaning against a wall or sitting down. Martin returned from medical leave in January 2019 with the season's fifteenth episode. He departed as a series regular after the eighth season, having been cast in the NBC pilot Irrational, though he is expected to recur.

Film work 
On March 4, 2013, it was announced that Martin would replace Lenny Kravitz as Marvin Gaye in Sexual Healing, an upcoming biopic directed by Julien Temple, and produced by Vassal Benton and Fred Bestall. Martin had been attached to the Marvin Gaye biopic for years and had stated that it was his dream role to portray the legendary Motown singer. With only three weeks to go on a planned nine-and-a-half week shoot, it was reported that production had stopped on the biopic, primarily due to financial problems  (crew members were said to have not been paid fully for their work on the film). Approximately 70% of the film had been shot.

Other work 
Martin narrated the audio book The Fire Next Time by James Baldwin and On the Shoulder of Giants, Volume 2: Master Intellects and Creative Giants by Kareem Abdul-Jabbar. He co-produced the off-Broadway production of Fully Committed with Rent co-star Adam Pascal (and two other producers).

Martin sits on the board of trustees for the Jonathan Larson Performing Arts Foundation along with Rent co-producer Kevin McCollum.

Personal life 
In October 2006, Martin returned to Buffalo, New York to work on an independent film (Buffalo Bushido), and was robbed two days after his arrival there.

In 2018, Martin suffered a back injury during the summer. He took a medical leave of absence from The Flash after recording scenes for a few episodes.

He is a resident of Manhattan.

Stage work 
Ring of Men (off-Broadway) – unknown date and character
The Prince and the Pauper (off-Broadway) – unknown character and date
Arabian Nights (off-Broadway) – Prince of Fools, Clarinetist, Boy (1994)
The Butcher's Daughter (Cleveland Playhouse) – unknown character (1993)
Timon of Athens (Broadway Premiere) – "Alcibiades' Officer" (original), "Second Masseur" (original), Alcibiades (understudy) (1993).
The Government Inspector (Broadway revival) – Abdulin (original), Panteleyeva (understudy) (1994)
Rent (off-Broadway) – Tom Collins (1996) 
Rent (Broadway) – Tom Collins (1996)
Rent (West End) – Tom Collins (1998)
Bright Lights, Big City (musical) (concept recording) – Tad 
The Threepenny Opera (Williamstown, MA; Williamstown Theatre Festival Production) – Macheath (2003)
The Merchant of Venice (Shakespeare in the Park) – Gratiano (summer 2010) 
The Winter's Tale (Shakespeare in the Park) – King Polixenes (summer 2010)
The Merchant of Venice (Broadway) – Gratiano (2010); transfer from the Shakespeare in the Park production 
Romeo and Juliet (Public Theater; Delacorte Theatre's 50th anniversary) – Gregory, Friar John, Watchman 2 (2012)

Filmography

Film

Television

Notes

References

External links 
 
 
No More 'Order' For Martin

1969 births
Living people
Male actors from Virginia
African-American male actors
American male film actors
American male stage actors
American male musical theatre actors
American male television actors
American male voice actors
Lee Strasberg Theatre and Film Institute alumni
Tisch School of the Arts alumni
Male actors from Buffalo, New York
People from Rocky Mount, Virginia
American male Shakespearean actors
African-American male singers